Elephant Hall may refer to:

Elephant Hall (Nebraska) in the University of Nebraska State Museum in Lincoln, Nebraska, United States
Elephant Hall (Letaba Rest Camp) a museum in Kruger National Park, South Africa

See also
Elephant Center (disambiguation)